The Theophilanthropists ("Friends of God and Man") were a Deistic sect, formed in France during the later part of the French Revolution.

Origins
Thomas Paine, together with other disciples of Rousseau and Robespierre, set up a new religion, in which Rousseau's Deism and Robespierre's civic virtue (rè de la vertu) would be combined. Jean-Baptiste Chemin wrote the Manuel des théopanthropophiles, and Valentin Haüy offered his institute for the blind as a provisional place of meeting. When, later, the Convention turned over to them the little church of Sainte Catherine, in Paris, the nascent sect won a few followers and protectors; still its progress was slow till Louis Marie de La Révellière-Lépeaux, an influential member of the Directory, took up its cause. 

But it was only after the Revolution of 18 Fructidor, which left La Révellière-Lépeaux master of the situation, that his sympathy bore fruit in the apogee of Theophilanthropism. Blended in a way with the culte décadaire, it came into possession of some of the great churches of Paris like Notre Dame de Paris, Saint-Jacques du Haut Pas, St-Médard etc.; it took a conspicuous part in all the national celebrations, and from the metropolis passed into the provinces, chiefly the Department of Yonne. 

The movement, in spite of a strong opposition on the part of Catholics, was gradually taking hold among the masses when the Directory brought it to an abrupt end. Napoleon Bonaparte suppressed the movement.

Catholic reaction
The constitutional clergy, in the national council at Notre Dame in 1797, protested against the new religion, and Henri Grégoire wrote in his Annales de la Religion (VI, no 5.): 

"Theophilanthropism is one of those derisive institutions which pretend to bring to God those very people whom they drive away from Him by estranging them from Christianity... .Abhorred by Christians, it is spurned by philosophers who, though they may not feel the need of a religion for themselves, still want the people to cling to the faith of their fathers."

Pope Pius VI on 17 May 1800 placed an interdict on the churches that had been used by deists, and Cardinal Consalvi, in the course of the negotiations regarding the Concordat of 1801, demanded that a speedy end be put to their use of the Catholic churches.

Later history

Sporadic attempts at reviving Theophilanthropism were made in the course of the nineteenth century. In 1829, Henri Carle founded "L'alliance religieuse universelle", with La libre conscience as its organ, but both society and periodical disappeared during the Franco-Prussian war. In 1882, Décembre and Vallières, through La fraternité universelle and many similar publications, sought directly to reorganize the sect, but the attempt failed and, in 1890,  Décembre confessed the impossibility of arousing public interest. Camerlynck's voluminous book, "Théisme", published in Paris in 1900, had a similar aim and met a similar fate.

Beliefs and organisation

Theophilanthropism was described in the Manuel du théophilanthropie, of which there were new editions made as the work progressed. The governing body consisted of two committees, one called "comité de direction morale", in charge of the spiritual, the other styled "comité des administrateurs" in charge of the temporalities. 

No dogmatic creed was imposed on the adherents of the new religion, the two fundamental tenets, viz. the existence of God and the immortality of the soul, being purely sentimental beliefs (croyances de sentiment) deemed necessary for the preservation of society and the welfare of individuals. The moral teaching, considered the principal feature of the movement, held a middle position between the severity of Stoicism and the laxity of Epicureanism. Its basic principle was good: good is all that tends to preserve and perfect the man; evil is all that tends to destroy or impair him. It is in light of that axiom and not of the Christian standard - in spite of the phraseology - that we should view the commandments concerning the adoration of God, the love of our neighbor, domestic virtues and patriotism.

Theophilanthropist worship was at first very simple and meant chiefly for the home: it consisted in a short invocation of God in the morning and a kind of examination of conscience at the end of the day. A plain altar on which were laid some flowers and fruits, a few inscriptions appended to the walls, a platform for the readers or speakers, were the only furnishings allowed. The founders were particularly anxious that this simplicity be strictly adhered to. Nevertheless, the progress of the sect led gradually to a more elaborate ceremonial. It is a far cry from the early meetings where the minister or père de famille, presided at prayer or mimicked Christian baptism, First Communion, marriages or funerals, to the gorgeous display of the so-called national festivals. There even was a Theophilanthropist Mass, which, however, came much nearer a Calvinist service than to the Catholic Liturgy.

Of the hymns adopted by the sect, some taken from the writings of J. B. Rousseau, Madame Deshoulières, or even Racine, breathe a noble spirit but, side by side with these, there are bombastic lucubrations like the "Hymne de la fondation de la ré" and the "Hymne a la souverainete du peuple". The same strange combination is found in the feasts where Socrates, Jean-Jacques Rousseau, and St Vincent de Paul are equally honored and in the sermon where political harangues interlard moral exhortations. In Dubroca's funeral oration of George Washington the orator, under cover of the American hero, catered to the rising Napoleon Bonaparte.

The first idea of the sect really belongs to David Williams, a Welsh minister who exercised considerable influence in Paris during the Revolution. Chemin consulted the Calvinists before launching his Manuel.

Notes

References
 Joseph Brugerette, Les cré religieuses de la revolution (Paris 1904):
 Moncure Conway, The Centenary of Theophilanthropy.  The Open Court, (1897)
 Giambattista Ferrero, Disamina Filosofica de Dommi e della Morale Religiosa de Teofilantropi (Turin 1798).
 Albert Mathiez, La Théophilanthropie et le culte decadaire, 1796-1801 (Paris 1903);
 Thomas Paine, The Age of Reason
 William Hamilton Reid, The Rise and Dissolution of the Infidel Societies in this Metropolis (London, 1800):
 Maurice Tourneaux, Bibliographie de l'histoire de Paris pendant la Révolution (Paris 1890-1900).
 Maurice Tourneaux, Contributions à l'histoire religieuse de la révolution française (Paris 1907);
 

Deism
Religion and the French Revolution